Seth Antonio Martinez (born August 29, 1994) is an American professional baseball pitcher for the Houston Astros of Major League Baseball (MLB).  From Sierra Vista, Arizona, Martinez attended Arizona State University and played college baseball for the Sun Devils.  The Oakland Athletics selected Martinez in the 17th round of the 2016 MLB draft.  Martinez remained in the Oakland organization until the Astros selected him in the 2020 Rule 5 draft, and he made his MLB debut in 2021.

Amateur career
Martinez was born and grew up in Sierra Vista, Arizona, and attended Sunrise Mountain High School, where he played baseball and golf. Over four varsity seasons, he posted a record of 19-4 with a 2.86 ERA and 172 strikeouts over 144 innings.

Martinez played college baseball for the Arizona State Sun Devils for three seasons.  He pitched both as a starter and in relief as a freshman and began his sophomore season as Arizona State's mid-week starter before being made the team's number one starter after seven starts. As a junior, Martinez went 9-4 with a 2.75 ERA and 94 strikeouts over 111.1 innings pitched and was named first team All-Pac-12 Conference and a second team All-American by Louisville Slugger.

Professional career
Martinez was selected in the 17th round of the 2016 Major League Baseball (MLB) draft by the Oakland Athletics.  After signing with the team, he was assigned to the Arizona League Athletics, where he pitched in three games. Martinez began the 2017 season with the Class A Short Season Vermont Lake Monsters before he was promoted to the Class A Beloit Snappers after one start. Martinez went 5-10 with a 3.49 ERA over 95.1 innings pitched with Beloit and returned to the team for the 2018 season. He began the 2019 season with the Stockton Ports of the California League and was promoted to the Double-A Midland RockHounds.

The Houston Astros selected Martinez in the minor league phase of the 2020 Rule 5 draft and assigned him to the AAA Sugar Land Skeeters to start the 2021 season. He was called up for his MLB debut on September 20, 2021.

Starting the 2022 season by hurling 17 scoreless innings with the Astros, Martinez took on a role as a long reliever.  He posted a 2.48 ERA over  innings through August 13, 2022, prior to a demotion to the Sugar Land Space Cowboys,  On August 25, 2022, the Astros recalled Martinez from Sugar Land.  Martinez earned his first major league win on September 15, 2022, after a scoreless inning versus the Athletics.

In 2022 with the Astros, he was 1–1 with a 2.09 ERA in 29 games covering  innings.

See also

 List of Arizona State University alumni
 Rule 5 draft results

References

External links

Arizona State Sun Devils bio

1994 births
Living people
People from Sierra Vista, Arizona
Baseball players from Arizona
Major League Baseball pitchers
Houston Astros players
Arizona State Sun Devils baseball players
Arizona League Athletics players
Vermont Lake Monsters players
Beloit Snappers players
Stockton Ports players
Midland RockHounds players
Sugar Land Skeeters players
Sugar Land Space Cowboys players